Kristal Anne Reisinger is a resident of Crestone, Colorado who has been missing since July 13, 2016. A mother of one, Reisinger relocated to Crestone from Denver in order to achieve enlightenment and sobriety. While in Crestone, she temporarily worked at the Crestone Brewing Company. Her last known confirmed sighting was on July 13 at her residence in downtown Crestone, but some have stated seeing her at a later date. In 2018, Saguache County Sheriff's Office and the Colorado Bureau of Investigation now believe foul play was the cause of Reisinger's disappearance.

Personal life
An Arizona native, Reisinger was relocated to Denver to be with her aunt after a difficult childhood upbringing. This arrangement became strained, leaving Reisinger as a ward of the court at the age of 15. At this time, Reisinger moved in with Rodney and Debbie Ervin after dating their son. Thereafter, Reisinger spent a few years with the Ervins before attending Western State College in Gunnison, where she met her best friend Michael. During the summer vacations from college she would live with Michael's family and after college she remained living between Michael's family and the Ervins.

In 2014, Reisinger moved from Denver to Gunnison, Colorado, teaching a course and taking coursework in psychology and sociology at Western Colorado University. Later that spring, she moved to Crestone in the San Luis Valley.

Reisinger was a very spiritual person with interests in Hinduism, Buddhism, and Native American religion. She also practiced tarotology and claimed to be a clairvoyant and a medium. She has one daughter with her former boyfriend Elijah Guana.

Disappearance
The Saguache County Sheriff’s Office was notified of Reisinger's prolonged absence by her landlord, Ara McDonald, on July 13, 2016. Once inside the apartment, investigators found Reisinger's cell phone and medication. Numerous Crestone residents claim to have seen her at the Full Moon Drum Circle gathering the night of July 18, 2016. McDonald and multiple sources claim the last person to have called Reisinger is a local man with a criminal history involving drugging and assaulting victims.

A $20,000 reward has been issued for any information leading to the arrest and conviction of those responsible for her disappearance.

Media
Beginning in August 2018, the podcast Up and Vanished focused on the case in its second season. 

The case has been the focus of an episode of "The Missing" on ID Discovery.

See also
List of people who disappeared

References

2010s missing person cases
2016 in Colorado
American psychics
American spiritual mediums
Clairvoyants
Crimes in Colorado
July 2016 crimes in the United States
July 2016 events in the United States
Missing person cases in Colorado
History of women in Colorado
Saguache County, Colorado